Airtel may refer to:

 Airtel (FBI), an outmoded FBI communication system
 Airtel Super Singer, an Indian television series.
 Airtel ATN, the data link company for aviation.
 Bharti Airtel, an Indian multinational telecommunications company that operates in total 19 countries across South Asia, Africa and the Channel Islands, with related pages:
 Airtel India, The second largest telecommunications network in India.
 Airtel digital TV, The digital television services offered by airtel.
 Airtel Payments Bank, a Payments bank exclusively for airtel users.
 Airtel Africa, an Indian mobile network operator that operates in 16 African countries.
 Airtel Bangladesh, an Indian mobile network operator in Bangladesh.
 Airtel Sri Lanka, an Indian mobile network operator in Sri Lanka.
 Airtel-Vodafone, an Indian mobile network operator in Channel Islands, UK.

See also
 Aertel, a teletext service on Irish television